The Colours of Zoth Ommog is a various artists compilation album released in 1994 by Zoth Ommog Records. Songs by Blok 57, Leæther Strip, Lights of Euphoria, Mentallo & The Fixer, Psychopomps, Spahn Ranch and X Marks the Pedwalk were previously unreleased in the bands' main discography. Spahn Ranch's "Failsafe", which later appeared on their compilation is incorrectly listed in the liner noted as being from the Breath and Taxes EP.

Reception
Music From the Empty Quarter recommended The Colours of Zoth Ommog and said "Zoth Ommog's compilations generally give a good insight into the full-length offerings on the label."

Track listing

Personnel
Adapted from The Colours of Zoth Ommog liner notes.

 Vernon Baur – photography
 Michael Goolaerts – additional guitar (1)
 Hype Graphics – design
 George Hagegeorge – remixer (11)
 Sevren Ni-Arb – remixer (5)
 Thorsten Marx – production (12)

Release history

References

External links 
 

1994 compilation albums
Zoth Ommog Records compilation albums